Archie Buchanan (2 October 1928 – 12 December 1983) was a Scottish football wing half who played in the Scottish League for Hibernian, St Mirren and Cowdenbeath. He later managed Cowdenbeath and scouted for St Mirren.

Career statistics

References 

1928 births
1983 deaths
Association football wing halves
Cowdenbeath F.C. players
Hibernian F.C. players
Scottish Football League players
Scottish footballers
Footballers from Edinburgh
St Mirren F.C. players
Place of death missing
Cowdenbeath F.C. managers
Scottish Football League managers
Scottish football managers
St Mirren F.C. non-playing staff